Somers Town or Somerstown may refer to:

Somers Town, London, a district of London, England
Somerstown, Portsmouth, a district of Portsmouth, England
Somers Town (film), a film directed by Shane Meadows

See also 
 Summerstown (disambiguation)